Namatetris is a genus of moths in the family Gelechiidae. It contains the species Namatetris rhinoceros, which is found in Namibia and South Africa.

References

Gelechiinae